Timothy James Shinnick (November 6, 1867 – May 18, 1944), was a Major League Baseball second baseman from  to . He played for the Louisville Colonels.

Shinnick's professional baseball career started in 1887. After his two seasons in the American Association, he played in the minor leagues until 1901.

External links

1867 births
1944 deaths
Major League Baseball second basemen
Louisville Colonels players
19th-century baseball players
Minor league baseball managers
Lowell Magicians players
Lowell Chippies players
Auburn Yankees players
Lowell (minor league baseball) players
Minneapolis Minnies players
Syracuse Stars (minor league baseball) players
Utica Stars players
Wilkes-Barre Coal Barons players
Haverhill (minor league baseball) players
Pawtucket Maroons players
Toronto Canucks players
Rochester Browns players
Auburn Maroons players
Johnstown Mormans players
Palmyra Mormans players
Troy Trojans (minor league) players
Elmira Pioneers players
Oswego Pioneers players
Ilion Typewriters players
Baseball players from New Hampshire